The Institute for Energy and Environmental Research (IEER) is an anti-nuclear organization which focuses on the environmental safety of nuclear weapons production, ozone layer depletion, and other issues relating to energy. IEER publishes a variety of books on energy-related issues, conducts workshops for activists on nuclear issues, and sponsors international symposia and educational outreach projects. IEER was established in 1987 and is based in Takoma Park, Maryland.

Arjun Makhijani is President of the Institute for Energy and Environmental Research.

See also 

 Anti-nuclear groups in the United States
 Efficient energy use
 List of nuclear accidents
 Nuclear whistleblowers
 Nuclear safety
 Renewable energy commercialization

References

External links
 IEER website
 Healthy from the Start: Campaign to Include Women, Children, and Future Generations in Environmental Health Standards

Anti-nuclear organizations based in the United States
Environmental organizations based in the United States